Solihull School is a coeducational private day school in Solihull, West Midlands, England. Founded in 1560, it is the oldest school in the town and is a member of the Headmasters' and Headmistresses' Conference.

History 
In 1560 the revenues of the chantry chapels of St Mary and St Katherine in the parish church of St Alphege, Solihull were diverted for the endowment of a school for boys. The revenue of the chapel of St Alphege was added to the fund six years later, enhancing the capacity of the school. The education remained based in teachings of the Church and the desire to turn out 'respectable, thoughtful, successful young gentlemen'.

In the 17th century it became a boarding school and the number of pupils grew. The school became more notable and well thought of owing to the involvement of several prominent families. Much of this development came under the Headmastership of the Rev. Richard Mashiter who, in 1735, was famously elected ahead of Samuel Johnson, a celebrated author, essayist, and lexicographer. Johnson was passed over because the school's directors thought he was "a very haughty, ill-natured gent., and that he has such a way of distorting his fface [sic] (which though he can't help) the gent[s] think it may affect some lads in the pursuit of learning". The successful applicant Mashiter was, by marriage, related to the aristocratic Holbeche family and his daughter married John Short, a well-respected surgeon in Solihull who would go on to serve the school as a Feoffee for 57 years. Short's six sons were all educated at Solihull School and became professionally and socially successful. One of them, Robert Short, rose to the rank of Lieutenant-Colonel in the army of the East India Company and later became 54th Lord of The Manor of Solihull. Owing to a strong affection for Solihull School he expressly recommended it to his fellow officers and peers, according to the diaries of Caroline Clive.

In around 1879 the feoffees were replaced by a board of Governors who allowed £4,345 to be made available for an architect, J. A. Chatwin, to be commissioned to build a new school on a new site for 80 day boys and 20 boarders. Upon the building's completion in 1882, the school relocated to the new site on the Warwick Road from its previous location on the edge of Brueton Park. 'School House' is now a grade II listed building. Expansion continued on this Warwick Road site into the 20th century. Over the course of the 20th century the school grew steadily from 200 to nearly 1000 pupils.

In 1960 a new chapel was built and was named The Chapel of St Mary and St Katherine to commemorate the origins of the school.

In 1962 the school was visited by Queen Elizabeth II.

In the early 1970s the school admitted girls into the Sixth Form for the first time. Only ten girls joined in the first year, but this grew quickly over the following years, until 2002 when for the first time as many girls entered the Sixth Form as did boys.

Perhaps the major change to the life of the school since the demise of boarding took place in September 2005, when the school began a transition to becoming fully co-educational, at first admitting girls into all four years of the Junior School and at 11+ level, beginning a process which was completed in 2009, when the first third form (year 7) girls reached upper fifth (year 11). The 2015-2016 academic year marked the first girls to go through the whole school from J1 to upper sixth.

In 2010 Solihull School celebrated its 450th anniversary. Both the school and the Old Silhillians' Association hosted a range of ceremonial, musical and sporting events to mark the historic occasion.

A sapling taken from the tree that Anne Frank could see from her hiding place in Amsterdam was planted at Solihull School as part of Remembrance Day commemorations 2015. The tree was planted by 86-year-old Auschwitz survivor Mindu Hornick – at an age similar to what Anne Frank would have been. The tree was the idea of Holly Krober (Pole, 2005-2016), who was so moved by her Solihull School trip to Auschwitz concentration camp with 3 other pupils that she was determined to commemorate the victims of the Holocaust.

In 2020 Solihull School merged with nearby girls school St Martins School. Today the former St Martins Campus houses the Prep School.

Facilities 
The school is based across two campuses. This is partly as a result of a former headmaster, Warin Foster Bushell, who in the 1920s bought much of the land himself when the governors refused to finance the purchase out of school funds. On his retirement Bushell sold the fields to the school at no profit. The school's quadrangle and surrounding classrooms, as well as the former hall, known as Big School, were built after this period, and were followed by a chapel and large teaching block and sports hall, amongst other additions. Solihull School has a number of rugby pitches, cricket squares and nets, tennis courts, football pitches and general purpose sports fields. There is a floodlit artificial pitch on the school's main campus, incorporating 2, 8x40 warm-up areas. The pitch is used primarily for hockey in the winter months and in the summer term the pitch affords a further 8 tennis courts and a multi-purpose training/coaching area.

One mile away, at Copt Heath, the school has another  of fields, comprising 4 rugby pitches, a new floodlit artificial pitch and a cricket square. These  are a part of the site that is home to the school's former pupils' organisation, the Old Silhillians' Association.

The school also possesses a mountain cottage in Snowdonia, North Wales. The cottage was presented to the school in 1958 by the parents of David Fricke, who was a school pupil between 1946-1956, following his death. David was a keen mountain walker and it was felt that the cottage would be a fitting tribute to his memory. Most pupils will visit the cottage as part of Snowdonia School in the shell forms. Those taking part in CCF or the Duke of Edinburgh award scheme may also use this facility on other occasions.

In recent years the school's investments have allowed it to enter a period of upgrading and extending of its buildings and facilities. In 1990 a building was constructed to house the junior school. This was followed by the extension of the science laboratories in 1995; the renovation of most classrooms, in 1998; and the conversion of Big School into a library, and the construction of a new hall and theatre building, completed in 2002, named the Bushell Hall after the former headmaster. A new pavilion was constructed in 2003, named the Alan Lee Pavilion after another former headmaster (1983–1996) who died shortly after its completion.

The expansion of the school's facilities shows no signs of stopping, with the construction of a new teaching block and redevelopment of a large part of the school, involving the demolition of several buildings from the early 20th century recently being completed. Opened in September 2005, this building provides fifteen new teaching rooms for the classics, history, economics and business studies, religious studies and IT departments. There is also a multi-purpose teaching room and a social area. This new facility has made department-based teaching possible throughout the school. It has been named the George Hill building after a governor of the school who died shortly before its completion. George Hill's business acumen helped secure the school's financial position throughout the 20th century.

In 2007, the governors of the school commissioned a new music school to be built for the 450th anniversary of the school. Building work started on the music school in 2008 with it scheduled for completion in 2010. It was later named the David Turnbull Music School, after a former director of music.

Building of a new sixth form centre - The Cooper Building - commenced in the summer of 2014 and completed in 2015. In November 2019 Solihull opened its newly refurbished refectory. In September 2019 Solihull announced its merger with Saint Martin's School from September 2020. Solihull Preparatory School (aged 3 – 11) is located on the Saint Martin's campus and Solihull Senior School (11 – 18 years) on the Warwick Road campus.

There are over 1,500 pupils, 440 at Solihull Preparatory School on the Saint Martin's campus and 1,100 in Solihull Senior School on the Warwick Road campus.

School houses 

 Fetherston (Gold) – named after Barnaby Fetherston who was the first usher of the school; a post that today would be called deputy master. Fetherston was instrumental in obtaining donations of land from Henry Hugford, Thomas Dabridgecourt, Thomas Waring and Thomas Greswolde. The later three have their arms incorporated in the school badge.
 Jago (Maroon) – named after 18th-century poet and Old Silhillian Richard Jago. Jago went to University College, Oxford and then returned to Warwickshire, eventually entering the clergy.
 Pole (Sky blue) – named after the school's first headmaster.
 Shenstone (Black) – named after 18th-century poet, Old Silhillian, classmate and lifelong friend of Jago, William Shenstone. Shenstone went to Pembroke College, Oxford and then returned home to manage his family's estate. On sporting occasions they are often referred to as the 'All Blacks', owing to their black shirts.
 Windsor (Royal blue) – created in 1959 as a mark of respect to the royal family. Shortly afterwards, in 1960 and 1962, the school received two royal visits; from The Duchess of Kent and Queen Elizabeth II respectively.

School structure 
The School is divided into sections, designed to create smaller units with which the pupils can identify. These form the basis of the pastoral structure of the school.

Solihull Preparatory School (Saint Martin's campus)

Nursery
Reception
Infants - I1 and I2
Junior School – J1, J2, J3, J4 (academic years 3, 4, 5, 6)
Solihull Senior School (Warwick Road campus)
Lower School – Thirds, Shells, Fourths (7, 8, 9)
Middle School – Lower Fifth, Upper Fifth (10, 11)
Upper School – Lower Sixth, Upper Sixth (12, 13)

Prefectorial system 
Pupils are selected by members of staff to hold positions of responsibility within the various sections of the school. They are, in the senior school, known as benchers. Benchers are selected based on fortitude of character and due to the belief that they will uphold the ethos of the school. Details of the different benches are listed below in descending seniority:

Heads of school – After a detailed interview process, the staff will select one male and one female member of the upper sixth to be head boy and head girl. 
The school bench – School benchers are selected by means of a poll of their peers and members of staff at the end of their lower sixth year. They are responsible for the behaviour of pupils in the refectory; general behaviour and standards of other pupils; and giving tours of the school to parents of prospective pupils. Although they cannot, nowadays, directly give detentions, they can refer pupils who may be deserving of punishment to a house master. They are the only pupils in the school who are allowed to walk across the grass in the Great Quadrangle; all others must walk around the paved perimeter. They are denoted by virtue of wearing a small, maroon rosette on the left lapel; it is affectionately known as a cabbage.
Middle school bench – Middle school benchers are members of the upper fifth and are selected by members of staff. They wear a cabbage similar to that of the senior school benchers, but dark green rather than maroon.
Lower school – Lower school benchers are selected from the fourth form and wear a blue cabbage.
Junior school – Monitors are selected from members of J4 and wear an enamel badge on the left lapel of the blazer. Their responsibilities are limited to the confines of the junior school.

Each section of the school has a head boy and head girl. The head boy and girl of upper school are known as heads of school.

Sport 
Sport plays a major part of life at Solihull School, as is true of many similar schools.

Boys' games
Rugby union is the main competitive team sport and is played from the age of 11 onwards. The first XV traditionally play in a dark blue jersey with narrow, horizontal white and maroon stripes, white shorts and dark blue, maroon and white socks. The striped jersey has, in recent years, been swapped for a maroon shirt with blue sleeves. The teams have recently done well nationally, the first XV having won the Daily Mail Vase Cup in 2011 at Twickenham, which is the furthest the school has ever reached. Solihull School regularly produces players who attain representative honours at county level and beyond. The Big Side teams tour biennially to, amongst other countries, Australia, South Africa, Canada and New Zealand. In 2014, the school's senior rugby squad toured South Africa. The U15 age group travel to Italy or France each year to play against several club sides. Solihull School also plays rugby sevens, competing at national tournaments such as The National Schools Sevens at Rosslyn Park, Blackpool Sevens and Fylde Sevens. The Old Boys fixture is always an anticipated and contested event, with many pupils, Old Silhillians and parents turning out to watch the current XV compete against a selection of Old Silhillians. The match, held in early December, is usually preceded by a barbecue and followed by drinks, speeches and presentations in the Alan Lee pavilion.
Hockey is also a popular sport. Solihull School has former Olympic team member, Chris Mayer, as head hockey coach. The first XI have, in recent years, scored victories over the likes of Rugby School and Warwick School, both of which are local rivals, advancing through the rounds of the regional and national cup competitions in the process.
Football has recently been adopted into the curriculum in the senior school and the 1st XI compete in the ISFA.
Cricket has, in recent years, produced players who have represented Warwickshire CCC at first-class level. Several players have been rewarded for school and county performance with international honours. Both batsmen and bowlers from Solihull School have been cited in the Wisden Cricketers' Almanack for their performance over the course of a season. The school's recently formed Twenty20 team, who play in an all red kit, compete at various Twenty20 schools' tournaments around the country.
Athletics – The school provides many representatives for the Solihull Borough athletics team, as well and the West Midlands and Midlands teams. Daniel Caines, former world champion indoor 400 m runner, is an Old Silhillian.

Girls' games
Hockey is the main winter sport for girls including Matthew Ashbea. The team competes in regional and national competitions. The Solihull School kit consists of maroon or white tops, navy blue skirts and socks.
Rounders is played in the summer and the first team play a wide range of schools from across the country. The team plays in a blue skirt and white polo shirt. A picnic is held for the upper sixth pupils on the afternoon of the last game of the season.
Netball is popular, with a 1st and 2nd team competing during the summer term. The teams play in identical kits to that of the rounders team.
Athletics. The squad travel to, and compete at many of the same competitions as the boys. The girls do not take part in as many invitational meetings as the boys' team.

Sports as such golf, shooting (both clay pigeon and rifle shooting), swimming, cross country, sailing, tennis, squash, and badminton are all played within the school and teams are put forward to compete against other schools. Also, an even wider range of sports are played recreationally. These include basketball, lacrosse, and water polo.

School colours
For many years, school colours have been bestowed upon Solihull School pupils who have represented the school at a high level in their chosen sport. The reward takes the form of a dark blue blazer with narrow red and white vertical stripes. These may be worn instead of the standard plain blue blazer or suit jacket.

Since 2006 it has been possible for those pupils who have achieved in debating, leadership, drama, music or community service to also be awarded school colours. When a pupil achieves school colours, they get a silver school crest that goes on the breast pocket. Those achieving "double colours" get a gold crest to replace the silver.

Music and drama 
The school has a music society. There are three orchestras, a big band and numerous instrumental groups and choirs. These range from traditional wind and string ensembles to African and Samba percussion groups.

Both the music and drama departments are able to use the Bushell Hall for performances. This building is used as an assembly hall and has a retractable stage with under-stage orchestra pit and seats an audience of around 1,000.

Outdoor pursuits 
The D of E scheme is popular amongst the Senior School pupils; many achieve the Gold Award. There is support available to any pupil wishing to partake in this scheme and there are several members of staff who take groups camping as part of their D of E course.
Terriers is a course for the third form that introduces them to many outdoor skills. They learn to read maps, erect tents, hike, climb, canoe etc. The culmination of this course is a week spent in the school's cottage in Snowdonia (owned by Janeene Coppagnee Estate) when in shell sorm where all of these skills are put to use.
The Mountain Club is a purely recreational society co-run by staff and older pupils. Trips are organised to parts of the country in order that a day or two of hiking may be enjoyed.
There is, biennially, an expedition. Pupils and teachers have the opportunity to travel to places such as Tibet, Nepal, Peru, Chile and Canada for the purposes of trekking in, and the exploration of, distant mountainous regions.
There is a ski trip each year, usually to the French Alps for the three sections of the senior school.

School publications 
The Shenstonian is the school's annual publication and reviews the academic, sporting and other events within the school. It chronicles the achievements of pupils and publishes works of arts, poetry and prose. Although the editor is a member of staff, it is largely contributed to by team captains, house captains, heads of societies and other pupils. It is named, as is one of the houses, after the notable poet and Old Silhillian William Shenstone.
The Silhillian is the annual magazine of the Old Silhillians' Association. It includes news of the school, messages from the committee, news of former pupils, reminiscences of School, news of the Old Silhillian sports clubs and obituaries of Old Silhillians and former teachers.
The Greyhound is a termly publication, which replaced the headmaster's end of term letter. The magazine, in full colour, includes all the term's news and successes. It is available to view on the School's website in PDF format.
Marginal Gains is a termly publication of the history and politics department, in which students produce articles to be published and distributed around the school.

Notable alumni

Sport
 Richard Masters, Chief Executive of the Premier League
 Daniel Caines, athlete
 John Curry, figure skater
 Adrian Ellison, Olympic rowing coxswain 1984
 Frank Foster, England cricketer
 Will Grigg, Northern Ireland footballer
 James Hudson, rugby union player
 Richard Johnson, cricketer
 Keith Jones, cricketer
 Matthew Macklin, middleweight boxer
 Bert Millichip, former chairman of the Football Association
 Jim Proudfoot, football commentator
 Bernard Quaife, cricketer
 Mike Rawson, Olympic middle distance runner
 Jamie Spires, cricketer
 James Wallis, Great-Britain hockey player
 Aoife Mannion, Footballer, Manchester United

Arts and entertainment
 Adrian Nicholas Godfrey aka Nikki Sudden, singer-songwriter
 Philip Achille, harmonica player
 Cecil Aldin, artist and illustrator
 James Barralet, cellist
 David Briggs, organist and composer
 Michael Buerk, broadcaster and journalist
 Mike Bullen, writer
 John Butt, conductor, organist, harpsichordist, and academic
 Stephen Cole, broadcast journalist and news presenter
 Laurence Cummings, harpsichordist, organist, and conductor
 Andy Dickens, jazz musician
 Paul Hale, organist and Rector Chori of Southwell Minster
 Richard Hammond, journalist and television presenter (Top Gear and The Grand Tour)
 Richard Jago, poet
 Stewart Lee, comedian
 Simon Mayo, BBC radio DJ and author 
 Phil Oakey, singer and songwriter (The Human League) 
 Theo Travis, musical artist
 Lizo Mzimba, journalist and television presenter
 Miles Ratledge drummer and co-founder of Napalm Death
 Ritchie Neville, musician
 Genesis P-Orridge, musician
 William Shenstone, poet
 John Taylor, classicist
 Johnnie Walker, radio DJ
 Richard Wolfson, musician of Fischer-Z and Towering Inferno

Other (including academic and military)
 Malcolm Burley, Antarctic explorer and Royal Navy commander
 John Butterfield, Baron Butterfield, master of Downing College, Cambridge (1976–83) and vice-chancellor of the University of Cambridge (1983–85)
 Richard Alan Cross, professor of philosophy at University of Notre Dame
 Sir Derek Higgs, businessman
 Stevie Parle, chef
 Frank H. T. Rhodes, president, Cornell University
 Robert Short, East India Company lieutenant-colonel
 Roger Tayler, astronomer, secretary (1971–79), treasurer (1979–87) and president (1989–90) of the Royal Astronomical Society
 David Tustin, suffragan Bishop of Grimsby
 Clive Upton, Professor of Modern English Language at the University of Leeds
 Robert Vilain, professor of German and comparative literature at the University of Bristol
 Richard R. Weber, Churchill Professor of Mathematics for Operational Research in the Statistical Laboratory, University of Cambridge

Politics and governance

 Air Vice Marshal Peter John Harding, Defence Services Secretary (1994–98)
 Christopher Ingham, diplomat, deputy head of mission and chargé d'affaires in Bucharest, ambassador to Uzbekistan, ambassador to Tajikistan 
 Sir Donald Logan, diplomat, ambassador to Guinea (1960–62), information counsellor at the British embassy in Paris, ambassador to Bulgaria (1970–73), deputy UK representative to NATO (1973–75)
 Andrew MacKay, former Conservative MP for Bracknell and Deputy Chief Whip
 Sir Oliver Wright, diplomat, ambassador to West Germany (1975–81), ambassador to the United States, 1982–86).

References

External links 
 Solihull School official website
 Profile on the Independent Schools Council website
 Old Silhillians Association

Boys' schools in the West Midlands (county)
Private schools in Solihull
 
1560 establishments in England
Member schools of the Headmasters' and Headmistresses' Conference
Grade II listed buildings in the West Midlands (county)
Educational institutions established in the 1560s
Grade II listed educational buildings